Ivolginsky District (Ebilgyn  aimag) is an administrative and municipal district (raion), one of the twenty-one in the Republic of Buryatia, Russia. It is located in the center of the republic. Its administrative center is the rural locality (a selo) of Ivolginsk. As of the 2010 Census, the total population of the district was 37,983, with the population of Ivolginsk accounting for 19.4% of that number.

Geography

The district is located in central Buryatia,  mostly on the left bank of the Selenga River, in the geographical region of the Selenga Highlands.

History
The district was first established on August 25, 1939. In 1954, it was split between Selenginsky, Tarbagataysky, and Ulan-Udensky Districts, as well as Sovetsky City District of Ulan-Ude. In August 1985, Ivolginsky District was re-established.

Administrative and municipal status
Within the framework of administrative divisions, Ivolginsky District is one of the twenty-one in the Republic of Buryatia. The district is divided into four selsoviets and two somons, which comprise twenty-eight rural localities. As a municipal division, the district is incorporated as Ivolginsky Municipal District. Its four selsoviets and two somons are incorporated as six rural settlements within the municipal district. The selo of Ivolginsk serves as the administrative center of both the administrative and municipal district.

References

Notes

Sources

Districts of Buryatia